Thomas Kok (born 15 May 1998) is a Dutch professional footballer who plays as a midfielder for Preußen Münster. Besides the Netherlands, he has played in Norway.

References

External links
 
 

1997 births
Living people
Footballers from Tilburg
Dutch footballers
Association football midfielders
Eredivisie players
Eerste Divisie players
Norwegian First Division players
Willem II (football club) players
FC Dordrecht players
FK Jerv players
SC Preußen Münster players
Dutch expatriate footballers
Expatriate footballers in Norway
Dutch expatriate sportspeople in Norway
Expatriate footballers in Germany
Dutch expatriate sportspeople in Germany